Isaac Richard Jay Malitz (born 1947, in Cleveland, Ohio) is a logician who introduced the subject of positive set theory in his 1976 Ph.D. Thesis at UCLA.

References
 Isaac (Richard) Jay Malitz – entry in the Mathematics Genealogy Project

1947 births
Living people
American logicians
University of California, Los Angeles alumni
Scientists from Cleveland
Date of birth missing (living people)
20th-century American mathematicians